John Keogh is an Irish musician, producer, director and television personality. In the 1960s he was the lead singer of the showband, The Greenbeats, and later became a producer at RTÉ. The productions on RTÉ which he produced include The Live Mike and Bull Island. He has also appeared in a number of RTÉ shows including The Lyrics Board where he was a team captain for a season and Killinaskully. He once took part in the 1965 Irish National Song Festival with the song "Yesterday's Dream" coming 3rd.

References

Year of birth missing (living people)
Living people
Irish male stage actors
Irish television producers
RTÉ people
People educated at C.B.C. Monkstown